The CD4E is a 4-speed automatic transaxle for front-wheel-drive cars from 1994 to 2007. It was manufactured at Ford's Batavia Transmission plant starting in 1994. The CD4E was called the LA4A-EL by Mazda and is also known as the 4F44E internally to Ford.

Applications:
 1994–2002 Mazda 626 4-cylinder
 1994–1997 Mazda MX-6 4-cylinder
 1994–1997 Ford Probe 4-cylinder
 1995–2000 Ford Contour
 1995–2000 Mercury Mystique
 1995–2007 Ford Mondeo (up to Mondeo III 4-cylinder model)
 1999–2002 Mercury Cougar
 2001–2008 Ford Escape
 2001–2006 Mazda Tribute
 2005–2008 Mercury Mariner

References

See also
 List of Ford transmissions

CD4E
Motor vehicles manufactured in the United States